Noboru Yamaguchi may refer to:

, Japanese writer
, Japanese yakuza